The Porto Metropolitan Area (abbreviated as AMP) is a metropolitan area in northern Portugal centered on the City of Porto, Portugal's second largest city. The metropolitan area, covering 17 municipalities, is the second largest urban area in the country and one of the largest in the European Union, with a population in 2011 of 2,421,038 in an area of 2,040.31 km².

The Porto Metropolitan Area is a major economic engine in Portugal, with a very high HDI (Human Development Index) and a GDP above the European average. Porto has been Portugal's largest manufacturing region since the Industrial Revolution and is home to many of the country's largest corporations.

History
The original Metropolitan Area of Porto was constituted by nine municipalities:  Porto (the capital), Espinho, Gondomar, Maia, Matosinhos, Póvoa de Varzim, Vila Nova de Gaia, Valongo, and Vila do Conde. 
The process of enlargement: 
Arouca (joined 08/01/2005)
Oliveira de Azeméis (joined 01/09/2008)
Paredes (joined 12/09/2013)
São João da Madeira (joined 08/01/2005)
Santa Maria da Feira (joined 08/01/2005)
Santo Tirso (joined 08/01/2005)
Trofa (joined (08/01/2005)
Vale de Cambra (joined (01/09/2008)

Government

The metropolitan area is governed by the Junta Metropolitana do Porto (JMP), headquartered in Avenida dos Aliados, in downtown Porto under the presidency of Hermínio Loureiro, also the mayor of Oliveira de Azeméis municipality, since the Municipal Elections held in 2013, when he succeeded Rui Rio, mayor of Porto.

The Assembleia Metropolitana do Porto (Porto Metropolitan Assembly) is composed of 43 MPs, the PSD party has 20 seats, the PS 16, the CDS 3, CDU 3 and the BE, one.

Although the government has halted the intention of creating new metropolitan areas and urban communities, it is keen to ensure greater autonomy to Porto and Lisbon metropolitan areas.

Urban areas and agglomeration

Greater Porto is the second largest metropolitan area of Portugal, with about 1.7 million people. It groups the larger Porto Urban Area, the second largest in the country, assembled by the municipalities of Porto, Matosinhos, Vila Nova de Gaia, Gondomar, Valongo and Maia. A smaller urban area of Póvoa de Varzim and Vila do Conde, which ranks as the six largest in continental Portugal. The new regional spatial planning program (PROT-Norte), recognizes both urban areas and engages in their development.

There are some intentions to merge the municipalities of Porto with Gaia and Matosinhos into a single and greater municipality, and there is an ongoing civil requisition for that objective. The government also started to discuss the merging of some municipalities due to conurbations, but gave up. There is a similar idea for the conurbation of Póvoa de Varzim and Vila do Conde, and both municipalities have decided to work as if both are the same city, cooperating in health, education, transports and other areas. Several municipalities of the metropolitan area also moved closer, thus becoming a cohesive group.

The urban-metropolitan agglomeration known as Northern-western Urban-Metropolitan Agglomeration or Porto Metropolitan Arch is a regional urban system of polycentric nature  that stretches far beyond the metropolitan borders, and includes circa 3 million people, which takes in other main urban areas such as Braga and Guimarães, the third and eighth largest cities (as defined by urban areas) of Portugal. The entire region of Northern-western Portugal is, in fact, a single agglomeration, linking Porto and Braga to Vigo in Galicia  Spain.

Population

Transportation

The Metropolitan area is keen to develop its transportation network. Porto Metro is a Rapid transit system that links the municipalities of Porto, Vila Nova de Gaia, Matosinhos, Gondomar, Maia, Vila do Conde and Póvoa de Varzim.

The Porto/ Francisco de Sá Carneiro Airport / Pedras Rubras (OPO), between the municipalities of Maia, Matosinhos, and Vila do Conde, is also one of its greater investments. It was transformed from an old and obsolete airport to a modern transportation centre, linked to Porto Metro. The JMP is also trying to pressure the government to add a TGV line to link Vigo in Galicia to Porto Airport in order to make Porto the air traffic centre of the North-Western Iberian Peninsula and to tighten its historical ties with that Spanish province.

Greater Porto is served by a great number of Motorways linking the main central areas of the metropolitan region and the region with other main Portuguese cities (cidades portuguesas).
Main Harbour: Leixões (Matosinhos).
Motorways:
A1 - Lisbon - Porto (North Motorway)
A3 - Porto - Valença
A4 - Porto - Quintanilha/Espanha
A7 - Póvoa de Varzim - Vila Pouca de Aguiar
A20 - Carvalhos - Nó de Francos (CRIP - Porto Inner-Ring Motorway)
A28 - Porto - Caminha (Northern Littoral Motorway)
A29 - Angeja - Porto
A32 - Oliveira de Azeméis - Porto
A41 - Perafita - Espinho (CREP - Porto Outer-Ring Motorway)
A42 - A41 - Felgueiras
A43 - Porto (A-20) - Aguiar de Sousa
A44 - Gulpilhares (A29) - A20

See also

Metropolitan areas in Portugal
Porto Metro
Porto Canal
Grande Porto
Entre Douro e Vouga

References

External links

Official website 

Porto
Metropolitan areas of Portugal